Baqerabad (also Romanized as Bāqerābād; also known as Bāqerābād-e Dīzgarān) is a village in Harasam Rural District, Homeyl District, Eslamabad-e Gharb County, Kermanshah Province, Iran. At the 2006 census, its population was 105, in 28 families.

References 

Populated places in Eslamabad-e Gharb County